Nate Diana Stevenson or simply ND "Indy" Stevenson (formerly Noelle Diana Stevenson; born December 31, 1991) is an American cartoonist and animation producer. He is the creator, showrunner, and executive producer of the animated television series She-Ra and the Princesses of Power, which ran from 2018 to 2020. He is also known for the fantasy graphic novel Nimona, as co-writer of the comic series Lumberjanes, and The Fire Never Goes Out, his autobiographical collection.

Stevenson's work has won multiple Eisner Awards as well as a Daytime Emmy Award and a GLAAD Media Award. Stevenson is non-binary and transmasculine and has written about being transgender in his webcomic I'm Fine I'm Fine Just Understand.

Early life 
ND Stevenson was born on December 31, 1991, in Columbia, South Carolina, to Diana and Hal Stevenson. He is the third of five siblings.

Stevenson was homeschooled before attending A.C. Flora High School. During his senior year, he created picture books and won a local award in the Visual Literacy Book Production category.

Career

Education and Nimona 

Stevenson attended the Maryland Institute College of Art, graduating in 2013. While there, Stevenson gained fame as a fan artist under the name "gingerhaze" for his "hipster Lord of the Rings" characters. He also created cover art for Rainbow Rowell's novel Fangirl, which was published in 2013.

During his junior year, he created his soon-to-be popular character Nimona as part of an assignment in one of his classes. In mid-2012, Stevenson began creating a webcomic around the character, also called Nimona, and soon signed with a literary agent who found the webcomic online. The agent helped him sign with HarperCollins to publish Nimona as a graphic novel. Nimona would double as Stevenson's senior thesis in 2012. For his work on Nimona, Stevenson won Slate Magazine's 2012 Cartoonist Studio Prize for Best Web Comic of the Year and the 2016 Eisner Award for Best Graphic Album: Reprint. Stevenson was also named a 2015 National Book Award Finalist for the graphic novel version of Nimona. Stevenson said that the ability to create comics on his own and create Nimona was what got him a "writing job in animation," bringing him into the animation world.

In the summer of 2012, Stevenson interned at BOOM! Studios, a comic publishing house in Los Angeles.

Lumberjanes and Marvel Comics 
After his graduation in 2013, Stevenson returned to BOOM! Studios to help develop, and eventually write, Lumberjanes.  Lumberjanes won Eisner Awards for Best New Series and Best Publication for Teens in 2015.

In 2015, Stevenson wrote for Marvel Comics on the comics Thor Annual and Runaways.

In 2020, Stevenson was described as executive producer and writer of a one-hour animated special introducing the characters of Lumberjanes, an animated series which will stream on HBO Max. It was also announced that he would write and direct episodes for the main series, while serving an executive producer. He was also described as working on the series in 2021 and 2022. However, as of February 2023, no news about the series has been announced, with HBO Max remaining silent on the series possible release.

She-Ra and other animation 
Stevenson was part of the writing team of Disney's animated series Wander Over Yonder, beginning with the second season in 2015.

Stevenson was the creator and executive producer of DreamWorks Animation's rebooted She-Ra and the Princesses of Power animated television series on Netflix, which ran for five seasons from 2018 to 2020 She-Ra received critical acclaim, with particular praise for its diverse cast and the complex relationship between She-Ra and her best friend-turned-archenemy Catra. In 2019, the show was nominated for a GLAAD Media Award for Outstanding Kids & Family Programming, as well as a Daytime Emmy Award at the 46th Daytime Emmy Awards. In 2021, the series was tied with First Day when it won the GLAAD Media Award for Outstanding Kids and Family Programming.

Other work 

Stevenson did freelance illustration for Random House, St. Martin's Press, and Label Magazine. He also worked with Ryan North on his book To Be or Not to Be (2013), a choose-your-own-adventure-book based on Shakespeare's Hamlet.

In 2017, Stevenson appeared in two episodes of Critical Role's first campaign as Tova. He has subsequently appeared in three Critical Role one-shot episodes between 2017 and 2022 as himself, Tova, and Peter Pan. In June 2022, his character Tova will was featured in a line of Critical Role miniatures by WizKids.

His autobiographical collection of drawings and journals, The Fire Never Goes Out, was published in March 2020. The New Yorker's review described it as "a memoir of sorts ... , a coming-out story, a love story, a tale of disorientingly rapid professional triumph, and a story about mental health and illness, showing the young artist figuring out what [he] must do-first to make art and then to get well."

In October 2021, Stevenson started a Substack titled "I'm Fine I'm Fine Just Understand" which will explore topics such as mental health, gender identity, and more, with premium subscribers given access to comics which "reflect more personal/sensitive topics." In August 2022, the Substack  was nominated for a Digital Book of the Year Harvey Award.

On February 4, 2022, Stevenson posted a fan comic of The Book of Boba Fett entitled "This Place Was Home" on Twitter.

Personal life
Stevenson married fellow cartoonist Molly Knox Ostertag in September 2019. He began working on She-Ra and the Princesses of Power at the same time that he began dating Ostertag, who was influential on the show "from the very beginning", coming up with a major plot twist in the show's final season.

In July 2020, Stevenson announced that he was "nonbinary, or something like it", and uses any personal pronouns. In November 2020, Stevenson published a comic about his top surgery. On March 31, 2021, the International Transgender Day of Visibility, Stevenson stated that he is transmasculine and bigender.

On October 11, 2020, National Coming Out Day, Stevenson wrote and illustrated his coming out story for Oprah Magazine. He described his journey to self-acceptance, his "battle against the gender essentialism of [his] Evangelical upbringing", and stated that he had become an atheist by age 23.

In an August 2020 interview, Stevenson stated that he is bipolar. In February 2021, he mentioned having ADHD in an interview and its impact on his work and life during the COVID-19 pandemic.

In August 2021, Stevenson changed his first name to ND, as noted by CBR, Out Magazine, ComicsBeat, Xtra Magazine, and Bleeding Cool. In October 2021, Stevenson said that he was "becoming increasingly aware of the practical need for a new, less gendered [name]... right now I don't really feel like I have one". On June 30, 2022, Stevenson announced he chose the name Nate, which he had been using privately since 2021, while being addressed as "ND Stevenson" professionally, and said his personal pronouns are he/him. He also said that he accepted "Indy" as a nickname.

Bibliography

Graphic novels 
 Nimona (HarperCollins, 2015)

Graphic non-fiction 
 The Fire Never Goes Out: A Memoir in Pictures (HarperCollins, 2020)

BOOM! Studios 
 "The Sweater Bandit" (in Adventure Time with Fionna & Cake #1, January 2013, collected in Volume 1: Mathemagical Edition, tpb, 160 pages, 2013)
 "Desert Treasure" ( in Adventure Time 2013 Summer Special, July 2013)
 Lumberjanes #1–17 (April 2014–August 2015)
 Volume 1: Beware the Kitten Holy (collects #1–4, writer with Grace Ellis and Gus A. Allen, tpb, 128 pages, 2015)
 Volume 2: Friendship to the Max (collects #5–8, writer with Grace Ellis and Gus A. Allen, tpb, 112 pages, 2015)
 Volume 3: A Terrible Plan (collects #9–12, writer with Shannon Watters and Carolyn Nowak, tpb, 112 pages, 2016)
 Volume 4: Out of Time (collects #14-17, writer with Shannon Watters and Gus A. Allen, tpb, 112 pages, 2016)
 Volume 5: Band Together (includes #13, writer with Shannon Watters and Gus A. Allen, tpb, 116 pages, 2016)
 Sleepy Hollow 4 #1–4 (4-issue limited series, backup stories, November 2014–January 2015)
 Sleepy Hollow: Volume 1 (tpb, 112 pages, 2015) collects:
 "Movie Night" (in #1, 2014)
 "At the Fair" (in #2, 4, 2014)
 "Shopping" (in #3, 2015)

Marvel Comics 
 Runaways vol. 4 #1–4 (4-issue limited series, August–November 2015)
 Battleworld (tpb, 120 pages, 2015) collects:
 "Doomed Youth" (writer with Sanford Greene, in #1–4, 2015)
 "Thor" (writer with Marguerite Sauvage, in Thor Annual #1, April 2015, collected in Volume 2: Who Holds the Hammer?, hc, 136 pages, 2015)

DC Comics 
 "Wonder World" (artist with James Tynion IV, in Sensation Comics Featuring Wonder Woman #23–24, February 2015, collected in Volume 2, tpb, 144 pages, 2015)

Filmography

Film

Television

Episodic writing credits

Awards and nominations

Notes

References

External links
 
 

1991 births
American atheists
American lesbian writers
American television producers
American webcomic creators
Disney people
DreamWorks Animation people
Eisner Award winners for Best Graphic Album: Reprint
Former evangelicals
LGBT comics creators
LGBT people from California
LGBT people from South Carolina
LGBT producers
American LGBT screenwriters
Living people
Maryland Institute College of Art alumni
Non-binary artists
People with bipolar disorder
Place of birth missing (living people)
Showrunners
Television producers from California
Television show creators
Transgender artists
American non-binary writers
American lesbian artists